The IX Conference of Heads of State and Government of the CPLP, commonly known as the 9th CPLP Summit (IX Cimeira da CPLP) was the 9th biennial meeting of heads of state and heads of government of the Community of Portuguese Language Countries, held in Maputo, Mozambique, on 13-20 July 2012.

Outcome
The theme of the 9th CPLP Summit was "Nutritional and Alimentary Security and the CPLP", centered on the importance of food security and nutrition.

Executive Secretary
Mozambican diplomat Murade Isaac Murargy was elected as the Executive Secretary of the Community of Portuguese Language Countries, succeeding Domingos Simões Pereira, former Prime Minister of Guinea-Bissau, in the position.

References

External links
CPLP Summits official site

CPLP Summits
Foreign relations of Mozambique
21st century in Maputo